World Won't Miss You is the 1990 full-length debut by heavy metal band Reverend. This album was dedicated to the late Dave Prichard of Armored Saint and features Chris Goss (Masters of Reality), Rocky George (Suicidal Tendencies), and Damien Circle (Flower Leperds) as guests. A cover of Black Sabbath's Hand of Doom is included on the CD version as a bonus track.

Track listing

Lineup
David Wayne: Vocals
Brian Korban: Guitars
Stuart Fujinami: Guitars
Dennis O'Hara: Bass
Rick Basha: Drums

Guests:
Chris Goss, Rocky George, and Damien Circle - "The Demonic Tabernacle Choir"

References

1990 albums
Reverend (band) albums